Zichem is a village of the town of Scherpenheuvel-Zichem in the Belgian province of Flemish Brabant. Zichem was an independent municipality until the municipal redistribution of 1977. Zichem is on the list of The most beautiful villages in Flanders as the most beautiful village of Flemish Brabant.

History 
Zichem belonged to Maria van Loon-Heinsberg, who was a descendant of the Counts of Loon. After her marriage in 1440 to Jan IV of Nassau, Zichem became part of the county of Nassau-Dillenburg.

Before the outbreak of the Eighty Years' War, Zichem was a thriving town. During the siege of Zichem in 1578 by Alexander Farnese, almost the entire garrison was killed. In 1580, Zichem was hit by an earthquake which toppled the castle's keep. On October 8, the Staatsen retook Zichem. In 1599, a large ignited city fire put a permanent end to the town, and the town was destroyed by the fire.

Geography 
The Demer(river) that flows through the city forms the border between the Kempen region in the north and the Hageland region in the south.

Sights to see 

 the Market Square, a copy of the village squares in Provence
 The 
 The 
 The birthplace of Ernest Claes
 the Witpeerd - a toll house built in 1617 to collect tolls on shipping traffic on the Demer.

Zichem and Ernest Claes 
Zichem is the birthplace of Ernest Claes, one of Flanders' most widely read writers in the second half of the 20th century.His birthplace is now a museum.

Zichem is also very well known for the book De Witte van Ernest Claes, which was later filmed several times.

Television Series 
The television series Wij, Heren van Zichem was based on several conjoined stories by Ernest Claes. Some of the filming for the series took place in the city.

Two films were also made "De Witte" (1934) by Jan Vanderheyden with a.o. Jef Bruyninckx, and "De Witte van Sichem" by Robbe De Hert (1980).

born in Zichem 

Ernest Claes (1885-1968), writer

Peter Jan Beckx(1795-1887), superior of the Jesuits.

Johnny White (1946-2014), singer

References

Former municipalities of Flemish Brabant